Narissapat Lam (born 7 March 1996) is a Thai of Hong Kong descent badminton player who specializes in doubles. In 2012, she won the Thailand Open with Saralee Thoungthongkam to become the youngest player ever to win a major doubles title since the Grand Prix categories began in 2007.

Achievements

BWF World Junior Championships
Girls' doubles

Asia Junior Championships
Girls' doubles

Mixed doubles

BWF Grand Prix 
The BWF Grand Prix has two levels, the Grand Prix and Grand Prix Gold. It is a series of badminton tournaments, sanctioned by the Badminton World Federation (BWF) since 2007.

Women's doubles

 Grand Prix Gold Tournament
 Grand Prix Tournament

BWF International Challenge/Series
Women's doubles

 BWF International Challenge tournament
 BWF International Series tournament

References 

Narissapat Lam
Living people
1996 births
Narissapat Lam
Narissapat Lam
Competitors at the 2013 Southeast Asian Games
Narissapat Lam